The 1997–98 Oklahoma Sooners men's basketball team represented the University of Oklahoma in competitive college basketball during the 1997–98 NCAA Division I men's basketball season. The Oklahoma Sooners men's basketball team played its home games in the Lloyd Noble Center and was a member of the National Collegiate Athletic Association's Big 12 Conference.

The team posted a 22–11 overall record (11–5 Big 12). The Sooners received a bid to the 1998 NCAA tournament as No. 10 seed in the East region. The Sooners lost to No. 7 seed Stanford, 94–87 in OT, in the opening round.

Roster

Schedule and results

|-
!colspan=9 style=| Non-conference regular season

|-
!colspan=9 style=| Big 12 Regular Season

|-
!colspan=9 style=| Big 12 Tournament

|-
!colspan=9 style=| NCAA Tournament

Rankings

References

Oklahoma Sooners men's basketball seasons
Oklahoma
Oklahoma